The 2021 Big East Conference men's soccer tournament was the post-season women's soccer tournament for the Big East Conference held from November 6 to 14, 2021, in the USA. The five-match tournament took place at Shaw Field in Washington, D.C. for the semifinals and finals, while the first round was hosted by the higher seeded team. The six-team single-elimination tournament consisted of three rounds based on seeding from regular season conference play. The defending champions were the Seton Hall Pirates. They were unable to defendtheir title after not qualifying for the tournament and finishing in last place in the regular season standings. Georgetown finished as tournament champions after defeating Providence 2–1 in overtime in the final.  This is the fifth title in program history for Georgetown, all of which have come under Head Coach Brian Wiese. As tournament champions, Georgetown earned the Big East's automatic place in the 2021 NCAA Division I men's soccer tournament.

Seeding 
The top six teams in the regular season earned a spot in the tournament. Teams were seeded based on regular season conference record and tiebreakers were used to determine seedings of teams that finished with the same record. The Semifinals and Finals of the tournament were hosted by the first seed, Georgetown. A tiebreaker was required to determine the fourth, fifth and sixth seeds as Creighton, Villanova and Butler all finished with identical 5–4–1 regular season records. When three teams are tied, a "mini-conference" is created with those three teams and the team with the best record is awarded the highest seed. Creighton earned the fourth seed after going 2–0–0 against Villanova and Butler.  Villanova earned the fifth seed by going 1–1–0 against the other teams.  Butler was the sixth seed after posting a 0–2–0 record against the other teams.

Bracket

Schedule

Quarterfinals

Semifinals

Final

Statistics

Goalscorers

All-Tournament team
Source:

* Offensive MVP
^ Defensive MVP

References 

Big East Conference Men's Soccer Tournament
Big East Conference Men's Soccer Tournament
2021 in sports in Washington, D.C.